The 2014 Oceania Women's Sevens Championship was the fourth edition of the tournament. It was held from 3–4 October 2014 in Noosa, Australia. Samoa was ranked ahead of PNG due to winning their head-to-head match. There were no semifinals but the top two teams, New Zealand and Australia, played off in a final to decide the championship title.

Tournament

Day 1

Day 2

Final

References

2014
2014 in New Zealand rugby union
2014 rugby sevens competitions
2014 in women's rugby union
Rugby sevens competitions in Australia
International rugby union competitions hosted by Australia
Sport in the Sunshine Coast, Queensland